Columbarium wormaldi is a species of deepwater sea snail, a marine gastropod, in the subfamily Columbariidae, the pagoda shells.

References

Columbariidae
Gastropods of New Zealand
Gastropods described in 1971